is a puzzle/logic-style adventure game published by Nintendo for the Nintendo DS platform. It is part of the Touch! Generations brand.

Plot
The game starts with the player visiting a secluded village library and finding a book full of numbers. The Character becomes so bored that he/she nods off to sleep and wakes up to find a pair of pixies beside them. They then request the character to reply to the question; "do we make ten?". Once the player has replied to this slightly odd question, the pixies whisk him/her away to Numberland. The King of this strange country asks that the player search throughout Numberland and find the nine Make 10 Masters.

The Trial Mountains
In the trial mountains you will have to play Make 10 games to clear a path to the top of the mountain. Once you defeat the Local Make 10 Champ in a Make 10 contest you will be able to ascend further up the mountain. At base 5 you will have to beat a Grand Champ and at base 10, a Super Champ. The Make 10 Games will grow steadily harder as you progress up the mountain.

The Make 10 Kingdom
The Make 10 kingdom is made up of several areas, some of these include Tenner forest and Toad Hamlet. You will be able to go to new areas when you receive the permission of the Make 10 Masters. The Paths to take you to the Make 10 Masters may sometimes be blocked or inaccessible, but using the stylus to prod secret foliage to reveal access routes never hurt anyone.

The Gathering Point
This is a gathering place for all the Make 10 Pixies. Here you can talk with pixies you have met during your travels and some may have handy hints and tips for the easy completion of certain Make 10 Games, and sometimes you can only progress in the game by talking to one or two specific pixies.

Make 10 Games
There are over 30 different games in Make 10: A Journey of Numbers. 30 are available at the Trial Mountains, and some bonus games help you unlock paths as you navigate the various areas in the Make 10 Kingdom.

 Do We Make 10?: In this game you will have to use the numbers on the heads of the pixies to determine whether or not they Make 10.
 Eclypse Stones: Use the stylus to move stones to hide unwanted numbers to make the remaining numbers Make 10. If there are 2 stones then they must both be used.
 Ninja Leaves
 House of 10
 Wrigglijig Battle: Use the stylus to write a number. This is added to the number on the front of the wrigglijig until it makes 10 and the numbers disappear.
 Croaking Clones
 Which Makes 10?
 Nut Tapper
 Number Hunt
 Ant Farm
 Blockling Jigsaw
 Ghost Stopper
 Number Blast: Get rid of the flying bats by shooting them with your number cannons. The number shown in each cannon is added to the bat. You win when the bat makes 10. If you are attacked by the bat, our cannons will break and you will not be able to fire
 Give or Take: Use the stylus to move add and subtract tiles to make a sum that will Make 10.

References
Make 10: A Journey of Numbers at Nintendo UK

External links
 
Official Muu Muu website 

2007 video games
Adventure games
Nintendo games
Nintendo DS games
Nintendo DS-only games
Puzzle video games
Touch! Generations
Video games developed in Japan